Pavao Miljavac (3 April 1953 – 5 December 2022) was a Croatian Army general.

He served as Chief of General Staff between 1996 and 1998, and between October 1998 and January 2000 he served as Croatia's Minister of Defence in the Cabinet of Zlatko Mateša, following Andrija Hebrang's resignation.

He ran in the January 2000 general election on the centre-right Croatian Democratic Union (HDZ) ticket, and won a seat in the Croatian Parliament. However, he left the party three months later and joined the newly established splinter party Democratic Centre in April 2000, along with other prominent HDZ members such as Vesna Škare-Ožbolt and Mate Granić.

Miljavac left politics after 2003. He owned a wood processing facility in Novigrad na Dobri.

References

1953 births
2022 deaths
People from Netretić
Croatian army officers
Military personnel of the Croatian War of Independence
Representatives in the modern Croatian Parliament
Democratic Centre (Croatia) politicians
Croatian Democratic Union politicians
Defence ministers of Croatia